The Geuzenpenning ('Beggar Medal') is a Dutch award given to persons or organizations who have fought for democracy and against dictatorship, racism and discrimination. It has been awarded annually since 1987 in the city of Vlaardingen.

The Geuzenpenning is an initiative of the Geuzen Resistance 1940–1945 Foundation. The organization takes its name from the a resistance group called 'Geuzen' which was active during World War II around Vlaardingen, Maassluis and Rotterdam. The resistance group, in turn, took its name from the Geuzen, a collection of armed groups that fought the Spanish occupation of the Low Countries in the 16th century, during the Dutch Revolt. Fifteen of the WWII Geuzen were executed by German forces at the Waaldorp plain on 13 March 1941, along with three leaders of the Amsterdam February Strike. After the war, surviving members of the group started the foundation to honor the memory of their fallen comrades and the Geuzen ideals, to promote and maintain democracy in the Netherlands and to heighten global awareness of all forms of dictatorship, discrimination and racism.

Recipients
The Geuzenpenning has been awarded to:
1987 – Amnesty International, Netherlands chapter
1988 – Queen Wilhelmina of the Netherlands (posthumously)
1989 – Stichting Februari 1941 (February 1941 Foundation)
1990 – Richard von Weizsäcker, president of West Germany
1991 – Bernard IJzerdraat, resistance fighter (posthumously) and László Tőkés, Romanian minister and revolutionary
1992 – Anne Frank Foundation  
1993 – Max van der Stoel, UN inspector in Iraq and High Commissioner on National Minorities in Europe
1994 – Doctors without Borders, Netherlands chapter
1995 – Václav Havel, president of the Czech Republic
1996 – Harry Wu, Chinese dissident
1997 – Mothers of the Plaza de Mayo
1998 – Vera Chirwa (Malawi, Africa), Noel Pearson (Australia), Muchtar Pakpahan (Indonesia, Asia), Rosalina Tuyuc (Guatemala, Americas) and Sergei Kovalyov (Russia, Europe)
1999 – Human Rights Association (Turkey), Turkish human rights organization
2000 – Nataša Kandić (Serbia) and Veton Surroi (Albania/Kosovo), human rights activists
2001 – European Roma Rights Centre and the Dutch National Sinti Organisation
2002 – Asma Jahangir, Pakistani lawyer and women's rights advocate
2003 – Defence for Children International
2004 – Íngrid Betancourt, Colombian politician
2005 – Richard Gere on behalf of International Campaign for Tibet, an organization for human rights and democracy in Tibet
2006 – Haitham Maleh, Syrian human rights activist
2007 – Human Rights Watch
2008 – Martti Ahtisaari, former president of Finland and mediator of international conflicts and civil wars
2009 – Al Haq and B'Tselem, a Palestinian and an Israeli human rights organization respectively
2010 – Betty Bigombe, president of the Arcadia Foundation
2011 – Sima Samar, Afghan human rights activist, and the Armed forces of the Netherlands
2012 – Grigory Shvedov, Russian human rights activist and journalist
2013 – Radhia Nasraoui, Tunesian lawyer and human rights activist
2014 – Thomas Hammarberg, Swedish human rights activist
2015 – 
2016 – Migrant Offshore Aid Station
2017 – Alice Nkom and Michel Togué, lawyers and LGBT advocates from Cameroon
2018 – Girls Not Brides: The Global Partnership to End Child Marriage
2019 – Padre Alejandro Solalinde Guerra, Mexican human rights activist and priest
2020 – ACPRA, Saudi human rights organisation
2021 – Małgorzata Gersdorf, a Polish lawyer and former supreme court judge
 2022 – Lawyers for Lawyers
 2023 – Assistance Association for Political Prisoners of Burma

References

External links 
 Geuzen Resistance 1940–1945 foundation

Dutch awards
Human rights in the Netherlands
Vlaardingen
Human rights awards